The 1978 Nova Scotia general election was held on September 19, 1978, to elect members of the 52nd House of Assembly of the Province of Nova Scotia, Canada. It was won by the Progressive Conservative party.

Results

Results by party

Results by region

Retiring incumbents
Liberal
Melinda MacLean, Colchester
Leonard L. Pace, Halifax-St. Margaret's

Progressive Conservative
John Wickwire, Queens

Nominated candidates
Legend
bold denotes party leader
† denotes an incumbent who is not running for re-election or was defeated in nomination contest

Valley

|-
|bgcolor=whitesmoke|Annapolis East
|
|Carl L. Bruce2,47036.37%
||
|Gerry Sheehy3,86356.88%
|
|Roger A. Boutilier4586.74%
|
| 
||
|Gerry Sheehy
|-
|bgcolor=whitesmoke|Annapolis West
|
|Peter M. Nicholson2,32943.78%
||
|Greg Kerr2,69050.56%
|
|Larry Duchesne3015.66%
|
|
||
|Peter M. Nicholson
|-
|bgcolor=whitesmoke|Clare
||
|Benoit Comeau2,96356.47%
|
|Gerald J.B. Comeau1,89636.13%
|
|Sylvio Gagnon3887.39%
|
|
||
|Benoit Comeau
|-
|bgcolor=whitesmoke|Digby
||
|Joseph H. Casey3,04851.56%
|
|John Comeau2,60344.03%
|
|John Gray2614.41%
|
|
||
|Joseph H. Casey
|-
|bgcolor=whitesmoke|Hants West
|
|Robert D. Lindsay3,48538.08%
||
|Ron Russell4,87253.23%
|
|Bill Shiers7958.69%
|
|
||
|Robert D. Lindsay
|-
|bgcolor=whitesmoke|Kings North
|
|Glenn Ells3,28342.77%
||
|Edward Twohig3,74448.78%
|
|Donald C. Fraser6498.45%
|
|
||
|Glenn Ells
|-
|bgcolor=whitesmoke|Kings South
|
|Wilbur H. Starratt1,52622.66%
||
|Harry How4,21462.58%
|
|Donald F. Archibald99414.76%
|
|
||
|Harry How
|-
|bgcolor=whitesmoke|Kings West
|
|Frank Bezanson3,55937.71%
||
|George Moody5,01153.09%
|
|William J. Dyer8699.21%
|
|
||
|Frank Bezanson
|}

South Shore

|-
|bgcolor=whitesmoke|Lunenburg Centre
|
|Jack Pelley3,15630.23%
||
|Bruce Cochran5,76455.22%
|
|Scott D. Miller4254.07%
|
|Walton Cook1,09410.48%
||
|Bruce Cochran
|-
|bgcolor=whitesmoke|Lunenburg East
|
|Wally MacDonald1,41728.01%
||
|Ron Barkhouse3,38666.93%
|
|Robert Whiting Sr.2565.06%
|
|
||
|Ron Barkhouse
|-
|bgcolor=whitesmoke|Lunenburg West
|
|Maurice DeLory2,79136.54%
||
|Mel Pickings3,90751.15%
|
|G.M. Dean94112.32%
|
|
||
|Maurice DeLory
|-
|bgcolor=whitesmoke|Queens
|
|Keith Wyer2,44033.85%
||
|John Leefe3,80052.72%
|
|A.J. d'Entremont96813.43%
|
|
||
|John Wickwire†
|-
|bgcolor=whitesmoke|Shelburne
||
|Harold Huskilson3,93245.06%
|
|A. Etheren Goreham3,68242.20%
|
|Jane A. Strange1,11212.74%
|
|
||
|Harold Huskilson 
|-
|rowspan=2 bgcolor=whitesmoke|Yarmouth 
||
|Fraser Mooney7,56829.25%
|
|Dorothy M. Crosby4,38916.96%
|
|Hartley Wickens1,2684.90%
|
| 
||
|Fraser Mooney
|-
||
|Hugh Tinkham7,33928.36%
|
|Harold H. Hanf4,12215.93%
|
|Charles Paddock1,1904.60%
|
|
||
|Hugh Tinkham
|}

Fundy-Northeast

|-
|bgcolor=whitesmoke|Colchester North
|
|Floyd Tucker3,02343.30%
||
|Bill Campbell3,44749.37% 
|
|Peter Robben5127.33%
|
|
||
|Floyd Tucker Colchester
|-
|bgcolor=whitesmoke|Colchester South
|
|Ed Lorraine2,18738.11%
||
|R. Colin Stewart3,23056.28%
|
|Chester Rice3225.61%
|
|
||
|Melinda MacLean† Colchester
|-
|bgcolor=whitesmoke|Cumberland Centre
||
|Guy Brown2,51553.75%
|
|Russell Fisher1,35428.94%
|
|Dennis R. Calder81017.31%
|
|
||
|Guy Brown
|-
|bgcolor=whitesmoke|Cumberland East
|
|Norman J. Mansour3,23434.15%
||
|Roger Stuart Bacon4,95552.33%
|
|Francis Soontiens1,28013.52%
|
|
||
|Roger Stuart Bacon
|-
|bgcolor=whitesmoke|Cumberland West
|
|Duncan Lake2,29243.72%
||
|D. L. George Henley2,63350.23%
|
|John S. Edgecombe3176.05%
|
|
||
|D. L. George Henley
|-
|bgcolor=whitesmoke|Hants East
|
|Jack Hawkins3,29442.15%
||
|G. Patrick Hunt4,03551.63%
|
|Clair White4866.22%
|
|
||
|Jack Hawkins
|-
|bgcolor=whitesmoke|Truro—Bible Hill
|
|Peter Wilson3,16037.04%
||
|Ron Giffin4,71355.24%
|
|Tom Barron5896.90%
|
|Bob Kirk700.82%
||
|New riding
|}

Central Halifax

|-
|bgcolor=whitesmoke|Halifax Bedford Basin
|
|Wilfred Moore4,08135.08%
||
|Joel Matheson6,32554.36%
|
|Tom Orman1,22910.56%
|
|
||
|New riding
|-
|bgcolor=whitesmoke|Halifax Chebucto
||
|Walter Fitzgerald3,99844.28%
|
|Margaret Stanbury3,73341.34%
|
|Donald F. Mielke1,29814.38%
|
|
||
|Walter Fitzgerald
|-
|bgcolor=whitesmoke|Halifax Citadel
|
|Ronald Wallace3,52537.82%
||
|Art Donahoe3,78040.56%
|
|Michael Bradfield2,01521.62%
|
|
||
|Ronald Wallace 
|-
|bgcolor=whitesmoke|Halifax Cornwallis
|
|George M. Mitchell3,10431.77%
||
|Terry Donahoe4,44645.51%
|
|Michael Coyle2,22022.72%
|
|
||
|George M. Mitchell
|-
|bgcolor=whitesmoke|Halifax Needham
||
|Gerald Regan3,55343.38%
|
|Pat Curran3,41641.70%
|
|James Miller1,22214.92%
|
|
||
|Gerald Regan
|}

Suburban Halifax

|-
|bgcolor=whitesmoke|Bedford-Musquodoboit Valley
|
|Jim MacLean2,74332.65%
||
|Ken Streatch4,95158.93%
|
|Gerald B. Hoganson7088.43%
|
|
||
|New riding
|-
|bgcolor=whitesmoke|Halifax Atlantic
|
|Jerry F. Blom2,30322.28%
||
|John Buchanan6,62864.13%
|
|Susan Holtz1,27412.33%
|
|Art Canning1311.27%
||
|John Buchanan
|-
|bgcolor=whitesmoke|Halifax-St. Margaret's
|
|Terry Tingley3,14932.45%
||
|Jerry Lawrence5,27754.38%
|
|Garry Richard Craig1,27813.17%
|
|
||
|Leonard L. Pace† 
|-
|bgcolor=whitesmoke|Sackville
|
|George Doucet3,55434.47%
||
|Malcolm A. MacKay5,24750.89%
|
|Doug MacDonald9909.60%
|
|Evan Morgan5195.03%
||
|George Doucet Halifax Cobequid
|}

Dartmouth/Cole Harbour/Eastern Shore

|-
|bgcolor=whitesmoke|Cole Harbour
|
|Peter Sawler2,78235.59%
||
|David Nantes4,27854.73%
|
|Daniel laFitte7579.68%
|
|
||
|New riding
|-
|bgcolor=whitesmoke|Dartmouth East
|
|Barbara Hart3,48836.27%
||
|Richard L. Weldon5,09853.02%
|
|Gabriel Des Rochers1,03010.71%
|
|
||
|New riding
|-
|bgcolor=whitesmoke|Dartmouth North
|
|Glen M. Bagnell2,92733.94%
||
|Laird Stirling4,56152.89%
|
|Nick Rolls1,13513.16%
|
|
||
|Glen M. Bagnell
|-
|bgcolor=whitesmoke|Dartmouth South
|
|Norman Crawford2,36525.38%
||
|Roland J. Thornhill5,53059.35%
|
|Mike Marshall1,42315.27%
|
|
||
|Roland J. Thornhill 
|-
|bgcolor=whitesmoke|Halifax Eastern Shore
|
|Alexander Garnet Brown3,91140.07%
||
|Tom McInnis5,29854.28%
|
|Daniel Matheson5525.66%
|
|
||
|Alexander Garnet Brown
|-
|}

Central Nova

|-
|bgcolor=whitesmoke|Antigonish 
||
|Bill Gillis4,68949.82%
|
|Bill McNeil3,71339.45%
|
|John Arthur Murphy1,01010.73%
|
|
||
|Bill Gillis 
|-
|bgcolor=whitesmoke|Guysborough
||
|A.M. "Sandy" Cameron3,30647.87%
|
|Jim Johnson3,29347.68%
|
|Kevin Patrick Keeping3074.45%
|
|
||
|A.M. "Sandy" Cameron
|-
|bgcolor=whitesmoke|Pictou Centre
|
|Erskine Cumming2,31320.00%
||
|Jack MacIsaac6,05652.36%
|
|Austin Sutton3,06826.52%
|
|Jim Beck1301.12%
||
|Jack MacIsaac 
|-
|bgcolor=whitesmoke|Pictou East
|
|W.G. Bill Munro2,36432.30%
||
|Donald Cameron4,31558.96%
|
|Bill Mitton6398.73%
|
|
||
|Donald Cameron
|-
|bgcolor=whitesmoke|Pictou West
|
|Dan Reid2,73540.61%
||
|Donald P. McInnes2,88842.89%
|
|John McDonald1,04715.55%
|
|Lloyd H. MacLellan640.95%
||
|Dan Reid
|}

Cape Breton

|-
|bgcolor=whitesmoke|Cape Breton Centre
|
|Francis MacLean2,99336.96%
|
|Peter MacKinnon1,51018.65%
||
|Buddy MacEachern3,59444.39%
|
|
||
|Buddy MacEachern
|-
|bgcolor=whitesmoke|Cape Breton East
|
|Vincent Kachafanas3,10927.21%
|
|Frank Edwards3,18227.85%
||
|Jeremy Akerman5,13544.94%
|
|
||
|Jeremy Akerman
|-
|bgcolor=whitesmoke|Cape Breton North
|
|Barry LeBlanc2,78228.17%
|
|Tom MacKeough3,21532.56%
||
|Len J. Arsenault3,87839.27%
|
|
||
|Tom MacKeough
|-
|bgcolor=whitesmoke|Cape Breton Nova
|
|Earle Tubrett2,86734.60%
|
|Percy Gaum1,50218.12%
||
|Paul MacEwan3,91847.28%
|
|
||
|Paul MacEwan
|-
|bgcolor=whitesmoke|Cape Breton South
||
|Vince MacLean7,04159.84%
|
|Donald C. MacNeil2,76123.46%
|
|Sandy MacNeil1,96516.70%
|
|
||
|Vince MacLean 
|-
|bgcolor=whitesmoke|Cape Breton—The Lakes
||
|Ossie Fraser3,47346.26%
|
|Jim MacDonald2,64235.19%
|
|Irene LeBlanc1,39318.55%
|
|
||
|New riding
|-
|bgcolor=whitesmoke|Cape Breton West
||
|David Muise3,66436.80%
|
|"Big" Donnie MacLeod3,08130.95%
|
|Frank Boone3,21132.25%|
|
||
|Ossie Fraser
|-
|rowspan=2 bgcolor=whitesmoke|Inverness
||
|William MacEachern6,27027.10%|
|Bernie MacLean5,41223.39%|
|Archie A. Chisholm6442.78%|
|
||
|William MacEachern
|-
||
|John Archie MacKenzie5,63224.34%|
|Bill MacIsaac4,61419.94%|
|Joyce Campbell5632.43%|
|
||
|John Archie MacKenzie
|-
|bgcolor=whitesmoke|Richmond
||
|Gaston LeBlanc3,28749.39%|
|Eva Landry2,44636.75%|
|Bruce Wright92213.85%|
|
||
|Gaston LeBlanc
|-
|bgcolor=whitesmoke|Victoria
||
|Peter John Nicholson2,19948.29%|
|Catherine MacNeil Jankowski1,99243.74%|
|Steve Lake3637.97%''
|
|
||
|Vacant
|}

References

1978 elections in Canada
1978
1978 in Nova Scotia
September 1978 events in Canada